The Intelligence Corps (Int Corps) is a corps of the British Army. It is responsible for gathering, analysing and disseminating military intelligence and also for counter-intelligence and security. The Director of the Intelligence Corps is a brigadier.

History

1814–1914
In the 19th century, British intelligence work was undertaken by the Intelligence Department of the War Office. An important figure was Sir Charles Wilson, a Royal Engineer who successfully pushed for reform of the War Office's treatment of topographical work.

In the early 1900s intelligence gathering was becoming better understood, to the point where a counter-intelligence organisation (MI5) was formed by the Directorate of Military Intelligence (DoMI) under Captain (later Major-General) Vernon Kell; overseas intelligence gathering began in 1912 by MI6 under Commander (later Captain) Mansfield Smith-Cumming.

1914–1929
Although the first proposals to create an intelligence corps came in 1905, the first Intelligence Corps was formed in August 1914 and originally included only officers and their servants. It left for France on 12 August 1914. The Royal Flying Corps was formed to monitor the ground, and provided aerial photographs for the Corps to analyse.

During the Irish War of Independence, Intelligence Corps operatives were used to monitor the Irish Republican Army. Following the war the Intelligence Corps was gradually scaled down and disbanded entirely in 1929; intelligence matters were left to individual unit officers.

Second World War
On 19 July 1940 a new Intelligence Corps was created by Army Order 112 and has existed since that time. The Army had been unprepared for collecting intelligence for deployment to France, and the only intelligence had been collected by Major Sir Gerald Templer. The Corps trained operatives to parachute at RAF Ringway; some of these were then dropped over France as part of the Special Operations Executive (SOE). Intelligence Corps officers were involved in forming the highly-effective Long Range Desert Group, and Corps officer Lt Col Peter Clayton was one of the four founders of the Special Air Service (SAS). Around 40 per cent of British Army personnel at Bletchley Park were in the Intelligence Corps.

The Combined Allied Intelligence Corps as it was known in Malta, began recruiting in 1940 following Italy’s entry into the war on the side of Germany. Among its many responsibilities in the Mediterranean Theatre were debriefing and interrogation of high-ranking prisoners of war in East Africa following Mussolini's invasion of Abyssinia (“Eldoret” P.O.W. Camp no. 365 being one example), counter-intelligence operations following Operation Husky the Allied invasion of Sicily in August 1943, and implementation of the Allied Screening Commission. The Commission was established by Field-Marshal Sir Harold Alexander a few days after the fall of Rome in June 1944 to identify and reimburse Italian civilians who had assisted Allied escapees.

Cold War
Throughout the Cold War, Intelligence Corps officers and NCOs (with changed insignia) were posted behind the Iron Curtain in East Germany, to join in the intelligence-gathering activities of the British Commanders'-in-Chief Mission to the Soviet Forces in Germany (Brixmis).

Northern Ireland
Many members of the Intelligence Corps served in Northern Ireland during "the Troubles". Units such as the Military Reaction Force, Special Reconnaissance Unit, Force Research Unit and 14 Intelligence Company contained Corps soldiers and officers.

Designation
On 1 February 1985 the corps was officially declared an 'Arm' (combat support) instead of a 'Service' (rear support).

Corps traditions
Intelligence Corps personnel wear a distinctive cypress green beret with a cap badge consisting of a union rose (a red rose with a white centre) between two laurel branches and surmounted by a crown. (According to the late Gavin Lyall, the Intelligence Corps cap badge is referred to jokingly as "a rampant pansy resting on its laurels".) Their motto is Manui Dat Cognitio Vires ("Knowledge gives Strength to the Arm"). The corps' quick march is The Rose & Laurel while its slow march is Henry Purcell's Trumpet Tune & Ayre. Due to the colour of the beret, Intelligence Corps personnel are often referred to as 'Green Slime', or simply 'Slime' by fellow soldiers.

Locations
Their headquarters, formerly at Maresfield, East Sussex, then Templer Barracks at Ashford, Kent, moved in 1997 to the former Royal Air Force station at Chicksands in Bedfordshire along with the Defence Intelligence and Security Centre (DISC). DISC was renamed as Joint Intelligence Training Group in January 2015.

The Intelligence Corps Museum was created in 1969, and later renamed as the Military Intelligence Museum, now also at Chicksands. As a working military base, the Museum can be visited by appointment only.

Training and promotion
The corps has a particularly high proportion of commissioned officers, many of them commissioned from the ranks, and also a high percentage of female members. Non-commissioned personnel join as an Operator Military Intelligence (OPMI) or Operator Military Intelligence (Linguist) (OPMI(L)). They do basic 14-week military training at either the Army Training Centre Pirbright, or the Army Training Regiment, Winchester. OPMI soldiers then will complete a 20-week special-to-arm training at Templer Training Delivery Wing, Chicksands, at the end of which they are promoted to Lance Corporal and posted to a battalion.

Current units
All battalions of the Intelligence Corps fall under 1st Intelligence, Surveillance and Reconnaissance Brigade of the 6th (UK) Division.  Below are the current units of the corps.
 Corps Headquarters, at Chicksands
Specialist Group Military Intelligence (Army Reserve), at Denison Barracks, Hermitage
Land Intelligence Fusion Centre, at Denison Barracks, Hermitage
Defence Intelligence Fusion Centre, at RAF Wyton
Army Element, Defence Intelligence Training Group, at Chicksands
1 Military Intelligence Battalion, at Gaza Barracks, Catterick Garrison
 Battalion Headquarters and Headquarters Company
11 Military Intelligence Company
12 Military Intelligence Company, at Imphal Barracks, York – supporting 1st (UK) Division
14 Military Intelligence Company
15 Military Intelligence Company
16 Military Intelligence Company, at Merville Barracks, Colchester Garrison – supporting 16 Air Assault Brigade
 2 Military Intelligence (Exploitation) Battalion, at Trenchard Lines, Upavon
 Battalion Headquarters and Headquarters Company
21 Military Intelligence Company, at Dalton Barracks, Abingdon-on-Thames
22 Military Intelligence Company
23 Military Intelligence Company, at Thiepval Barracks, Lisburn
24 Military Intelligence Company
25 Military Intelligence Company

 3 Military Intelligence Battalion (Reserve), in Hackney, London
 Battalion Headquarters and Headquarters Company, in Hackney, London
31 Military Intelligence Company, in Hackney, London
32 Military Intelligence Company, in Cambridge
33 Military Intelligence Company, in Hampstead, London
34 Military Intelligence Company, in Hampstead, London
 4 Military Intelligence Battalion, at Ward Barracks, Bulford Camp (Regular Army) – supports 3rd UK Division
 Battalion Headquarters and Headquarters Company
 41 Military Intelligence Company
 42 Military Intelligence Company
 43 Military Intelligence Company
 Operations Support Military Intelligence Company
 Logistic Support Section, at Aldershot Garrison — supporting 101st Logistic Brigade
Detachments, at Bovington Camp and in Germany
 5 Military Intelligence Battalion (Reserve), at Edinburgh Castle, Edinburgh – paired with 1 MI Bn
 Battalion Headquarters and Headquarters Company, at Edinburgh Castle, Edinburgh
51 Military Intelligence Company, in Edinburgh
Detachment in Glasgow
52 Military Intelligence Company, at Napier Armoury, Gateshead
53 Military Intelligence Company, at Carlton Barracks, Leeds
Detachment, at Wallis Barracks, Chesterfield
 6 Military Intelligence Battalion (Reserve), in Manchester – paired with 2 MI Bn
Battalion Headquarters and Headquarters Company, in Manchester
61 Military Intelligence Company, in Manchester
62 Military Intelligence Company, at Thiepval Barracks, Lisburn
Manx Detachment in Douglas, Isle of Man
63 Military Intelligence Company, in Stourbridge
Detachment in Bletchley
 7 Military Intelligence Battalion (Reserve), in Bristol – paired with 4 MI Bn
Battalion Headquarters and Headquarters Company, in Bristol
71 Military Intelligence Company, in Bristol
715 Military Intelligence Section, at Wyvern Barracks, Exeter
72 Military Intelligence Company, in Southampton
73 Military Intelligence Company, at Denison Barracks, Hermitage
74 Military Intelligence Company, at Raglan Barracks, Newport

Notable personnel
 :Category:Intelligence Corps officers

References

External links and further reading
 Official website
 Intelligence Corps Association
 3 MI Bn (V) – London
 5 MI Bn – Edinburgh
 Military Intelligence Museum
The Intelligence Corps in the Second World War The Services 1930 – 1956 at www.BritishMilitaryHistory.co.uk
 
 

 
Nationstate regiments/corps of military intelligence
1914 establishments in the United Kingdom
Military units and formations established in 1914
Military units and formations disestablished in 1929
Military units and formations established in 1940
Corps of the British Army in World War I
Corps of the British Army in World War II